The 1996 Australian Drivers' Championship was a motor racing competition open to drivers of racing cars complying with CAMS Formula Holden regulations. The championship winner was awarded the 1996 CAMS Gold Star as the Australian Drivers' Champion. It was the 40th running of the Australian Drivers' Championship and the eighth to feature the Formula Holden category. The championship began on 8 March 1996 at the Albert Park Street Circuit and ended on 2 June at Mallala Motor Sport Park after eight races held over four rounds.

Paul Stokell won his third Australian Drivers' Championship in a season dominated by him and his Birrana Racing teammate Jason Bright. The two dark blue Reynard 91Ds won every race of the season except one. Bright's early season unreliability became the difference between the two at season's end. The only race they did not claim was race two at the 1996 Australian Grand Prix meeting which saw Europe-bound Mark Webber in a guest drive in the Graham Watson owned Reynard, take the win when both Stokell and Bright retired. Darren Edwards was consistently best of the rest of the field, claiming four top three finishes over the season. Stephen Cramp took three seconds at the start of the season but faded, dropping to fifth in the championship behind Adam Kaplan.

Teams and drivers
The following drivers competed in the 1996 Australian Drivers' Championship.

Race calendar
The 1996 Australian Drivers' Championship was contested over eight races at four rounds held in two states.

Results
Points were awarded 20–15–12–10–8–6–4–3–2–1 based on the top ten race positions in each race. Only half points were awarded for Race 1 of Round 2 at Phillip Island.

Notes and references

External links
 CAMS Manual of Motor Sport > About CAMS > Titles CAMS Gold Star

Australian Drivers' Championship
Drivers' Championship
Formula Holden
Australian Drivers